Eresfjord is a village in Molde Municipality in Møre og Romsdal county, Norway. Approximately 450 inhabitants reside in the village (2008). The village is located along the river Eira between the Eresfjorden and the lake Eikesdalsvatnet. The mountain Skjorta lies just to the east of the village.

The village was the administrative center of the former municipality of Eresfjord og Vistdal from 1890 until 1964 when it was merged back into Nesset. Sira Church which was opened in 1869, is the main church for the area, and it is located in the middle of Eresfjord.

Agriculture, salmon fishing, and tourism are the main form of income in the area. Eresfjord also has its own hatchery (built in 1956) that provides salmon and sea trout to the Eira River and Eikesdalsvatnet. The plant puts out 50,000 salmon and 2,500 sea trout annually.

The village has a harbor for 33 small boats and offers a clubhouse, a dance floor, and a guest harbor which received a visit from the king in 2003.

National Geographic Adventure acknowledged Eresfjord as having the world's most beautiful skiing terrain.

Due to its northern location, the village has a relatively long and cold winter.

References

Molde
Villages in Møre og Romsdal